Watershed College (or Watershed) is a private boarding school situated in a pastoral setting near Marondera in Zimbabwe. The College provides secondary education as well as an Agricultural course for girls and boys between the ages of 13 and 19.

Watershed College is a member of the Association of Trust Schools (ATS) and the Headmistress is a member of the Conference of Heads of Independent Schools in Zimbabwe (CHISZ).

List of Heads at Watershed College
 Mr Tim Brown (1987-1991)
 Mr MJ. McGuire (1992-1994)
 Mr John Davidson (1995)
 Mr AB. Davey (1996-2000)
 Mr D. Seeliger (2001-2003)
 Dr J. Bradshaw (2003-2009)
 Mrs Angela Charidza (2010-2016)
 Mrs Fiona Benzon (2017–present)

Notable alumni

 Ray Price - Zimbabwean Cricketer
 Liam Middleton - Rugby Union Coach
 Tarisai Musakanda - Zimbabwean Cricketer
 Lovejoy Chawatama - Professional Rugby Player at London Irish
Ruramiso Mashumba - Farmer/ Agriprenuer
Kudakwashe "Kisset" Chirengende - Kyros Sports Founder
Clinton Mutambo - Esaja.com Founder
Kudakwashe Kudenga - Farmer/ Entrepreneur
Munya Maraire - World Wide Scholarships CEO & first Zimbabwean NFL prospect

See also

List of schools in Zimbabwe
List of boarding schools

References

External links
Official site
Watershed College Profile on the ATS website
http://www.sacau.org/blog/2017/07/28/meet-ruramiso-mashumba-sacaus-young-agripreneur-ambassador-2/
https://www.herald.co.zw/its-about-passion-not-money-sponsor/
https://thisisafrica.me/lifestyle/clinton-mutambo-breaking-barriers-trade-africa/

Boarding schools in Zimbabwe
Educational institutions established in 1987
High schools in Zimbabwe
Marondera
Private schools in Zimbabwe
Co-educational schools in Zimbabwe
Cambridge schools in Zimbabwe
Buildings and structures in Mashonaland East Province
Education in Mashonaland East Province
1987 establishments in Zimbabwe
Member schools of the Association of Trust Schools